Beijing is a municipality located in North China at the northern tip of the North China Plain, near the meeting point of the Xishan and Yanshan mountain ranges. The city itself lies on flat land (elevation ) that opens to the east and south. The municipality's outlying districts and counties extend into the mountains that surround the city from the southwest to the northeast.

Beijing Municipality consists of six city districts (previously eight, see Xuanwu and Chongwen), eight suburban districts and two rural counties.  It covers a total area of
. By land area, the municipality is slightly larger than the country of Montenegro, though much of the municipality outside the urban core are sparsely populated mountains and farmland. The terrain is roughly 38% flat and 62% mountainous. Aside from Tianjin, Beijing is bordered on all other sides by Hebei Province, including a piece wedged between Beijing and Tianjin.

Historically, Beijing was situated on the border between sedentary agricultural areas to the south and pastoralist regions beyond the mountains to the north.  The Great Wall of China was built across the mountains north of Beijing to guard against nomadic invasions.  In modern times, the same mountains that shielded Beijing from the Gobi steppes also form a semi-circular basin which catches the city's air pollution.  Severe smog problems develop in the summer as the hot and humid air pressure from monsoons in the south prevent air pollutants from leaving the basin.  Smog is less severe in the fall and winter when the direction of the wind currents reverse course  as the vast anticyclone high pressure system takes hold and brings cold, dry air from Siberia.  In the spring, the northerly winds, pick up dust from desertifying areas of western China and bring occasionally severe dust storms to Beijing.  The city's climate is characterized by hot, humid summers and cold, windy, and dry winters.

Layout of Beijing's administrative divisions

In imperial times, the old walled city of Beijing occupied . The inner suburbs, and outer suburbs provide further space for growth. The remaining  of the municipality consists of rural areas, nature reserves and lightly populated mountains.

Two urban districts, Dongcheng and Xicheng form the urban core of Beijing. They occupy the area inside the old walled city, which used to be divided into two walled sections, neicheng, the inner city and waicheng, the adjoining outer city to the south.  Though the city walls no longer stand, they continue to retain geographic significance.  Streets that once traversed the wall are still named nei (inner) or wai (outer) in relationship to whether the street section is inside or outside the wall. Today, Line 2 loop of the Beijing Subway traces the inner city wall.  The 2nd Ring Road outlines the combined walled city including the outer city.

The inner city is divided into eastern and western halves by Dongcheng and Xicheng Districts.  The Forbidden City, where emperors once lived, and Tiananmen Square, the center of the city, both belong to Dongcheng.  But the Zhongnanhai Compound, next door to the Forbidden City, where China's current leaders now reside, and the Great Hall of the People, on the west side of Tiananmen Square, both are part of Xicheng.  The outer city, adjacent and south of the inner city, comprises the former Xuanwu and Chongwen districts, merged with Xicheng and Dongcheng respectively in July 2010.  Chongwen is home to the Temple of Heaven.  Xuanwu is oldest continuously inhabited part of Beijing.  Some of its neighborhoods including those around the Niujie Mosque (b. 996 A.D.) and Pagoda of Tianning Temple (b. 1119 A.D.) predate the Yuan capital.  Unlike in most other parts of the city, most narrow lanes in Xuanwu are called jie instead of hutongs.  Each of the two core city districts has population density of over 20000 persons/km2 (51800 persons/sq. mi.)

Beyond the 2nd Ring Road, the city spreads out in a checkerboard fashion marked by concentric ring roads.  Four other districts, Haidian, Chaoyang, Fengtai and Shijingshan, were once considered on the city's outskirts, but are now integral parts of the city inside the 5th Ring Road.  All four have population densities above 4500 persons/km2 (11,600 persons/km2).  The vast Haidian District to the northwest is home to the Old and New Summer Palace, the university district, and Zhongguancun, the city's high-technology silicon village.  The even bigger Chaoyang District embraces the city from the north and east.  Its possessions include Beijing Central Business District (CBD), the Olympic Green, and even the Beijing Capital International Airport.  Shijingshan is a heavily industrialized district in the foothills of the Western Hills.  Fengtai spans across the south of urban Beijing.

Of the suburban districts further afield, Tongzhou and Shunyi in the east are rapidly urbanizing.  Mentougou and Fangshan lie to the west, in Xishan, also known as the Western Hills.  Fangshan is home to two of the oldest prehistoric sites in Beijing Municipality: the caves at Zhoukoudian, home of the Peking Man, and Liulihe, the site of the capital of the Yan Kingdom during the Western Zhou dynasty.  Daxing District, to the south, is largely agricultural but is also developing its own technology park in Yizhuang.  Changping just north of the city ranges from densely urbanized Tiantongyuan in the south to the Juyongguan Great Wall in the north.  In between are the Thirteen Ming Tombs.

Far north of the municipality in the Yanshan range are Yanqing and Miyun Counties, and Huairou and Pinggu Districts, both of which were rural counties until 2001.  The far north is rugged, rural and sparsely populated.  Yanqing, Huairou and Miyun all have fewer than 200 residents per km2 (518/sq. mi.).  They are perhaps best known for stretches of the Great Wall, with Badaling and Shuiguan in Yanqing, Mutianyu, Huanghuacheng and Jiankou in Huairou, and Gubeikou and Simatai in Miyun, and Jiangjunguan in Pinggu.

Topography

The plains from Beijing extend to the east as far as Shanhaiguan on the Bohai Sea and as far south as Nanjing, on the Yangtze River.

To the west is Xishan, also known as the Western Hills, which are visible from the city on clear days. Xishan forms the eastern flank of the Taihang Mountains range, which run north–south up the spine of Hebei province. Xishan covers nearly all of Fangshan and Mentougou Districts west of the city. East Lingshan (elevation ), a Xishan peak on the border with Hebei, is the highest point in Beijing Municipality. Xishan is also known for high mountain meadows and scenic river gorges, including Shidu. Foothills of Xishan reach the city itself. They include Fragrant Hills, a major tourist attraction and Laoshan, the site of mountain bike competition in the 2008 Summer Olympics.

The mountains north of Beijing including Badaling, Jundu Mountains and Fenghuanling all belong to the Yanshan range, which runs east–west, across northern Hebei Province. Yanshan separates the North China Plain from the steppes and held considerable military significance in history.

The Yanshan and Xishan ranges meet at Nankou, in Changping District, northwest of the city.  The intersection creates a massive fault line and rift valley through which the city's main roads and railroads to the northwest pass.

Hydrology

Several major rivers, including the Yongding, Chaobai, Juma and Wenyu flow through Beijing Municipality. They originate in the highlands of Hebei and Shanxi, cut through the mountains west and north of the city, and eventually flow into the Hai River, which empties into the Bohai Sea. Over the centuries, hydrologists have channeled rivers through the city into man-made lakes, moats, channels and aqueducts, which provide water to the city and drain its refuse, but no longer threaten Beijing with flooding.

Downtown Beijing has several lakes called hai or sea. During the Yuan dynasty, the Mongol rulers expanded them and built imperial palace of Dadu around them.  Subsequent emperors of the Ming and Qing dynasties used the lakes as imperial gardens.  Today, the three northernmost lakes, Xihai (West Sea), Houhai (Rear Sea) and Qianhai (Front Sea), collectively known as Shichahai, are lined with bars and cafés and known for nightlife.  To their south, Beihai (North Sea) is a city park, and Zhonghai (Central Sea) and Nanhai (South Sea) are part of the Zhongnanhai Compound, residence to China's leaders.  This string of lakes used to form the main riverbed of the Yongding River, which now flows  to the west.  But 1,800 years ago, the Yongding flowed through Jishuitan and downtown Beijing and then into Longtan Lake and on to Tongzhou.  A major flood in 295 A.D. devastated part of Beijing, then known as Ji.  Just west of Wangfujing, there is still a stretch of Beijing called Shatan or Sandy Beach.

Today, an aqueduct draws water from the Yongding through Yuyuantan Park to the western city moat, which empties into Liangshui River south of the city. Another aqueduct draws water from Kunming Lake in the Summer Palace down through the Purple Bamboo Park and into the northern city moat, which also replenishes Shichahai, Beihai and Zhongnanhai. The northern moats are drained by the Ba River, which flows into the Wenyu River. The southern and eastern moats are drained by the Tonghui River, which also flow into the Wenyu.

This network of rivers and aqueducts are fed by reservoirs to the north of the city. The Miyun Reservoir, the largest in the municipality, is created at the confluence of the Chao and Bai Rivers, which forms the Chaobai.  The Yongding, before entering the municipality in Mentougou District, is dammed to create the vast Guanting Reservoir of Hebei Province. Despite these reservoirs, the city of Beijing faces chronic water shortages due to water-intensive agriculture, industry, and population growth.  Under the South-North Water Transfer Project, the city plans to draw water from the Yangtze River through the Grand Canal, which was built 800 years ago for transportation, but now is being upgraded into a major aqueduct.

Climate

The city's climate is a rather dry, monsoon-influenced humid continental climate (Köppen climate classification Dwa), characterised by hot, humid summers due to the East Asian monsoon, and generally cold, windy, very dry winters that reflect the influence of the vast Siberian anticyclone. Yet during the winter, winds from the northwest must cross the mountains that shield the city, keeping the city warmer than other locations of similar latitude in China. Spring can bear witness to sandstorms blowing in from the Mongolian steppe, accompanied by rapidly warming, but generally dry, conditions. Autumn, like spring, sees little rain but is crisp and short. January averages , while July averages .

Coordinates

With coordinates of 39° 54' 50 N and 116° 23' 30" E, Beijing shares roughly the same latitude as Denver, Indianapolis, Columbus (Ohio), Philadelphia, Ankara, Bukhara, as well as Jiayuguan, Yumen, and Jiuquan in Gansu. The city lines up at about the same longitude as Xilinhot, Inner Mongolia; Dezhou, Shandong; Yongcheng, Henan; Lu'an, Anhui; Linchuan, Jiangxi; Changting, Fujian; Jieyang, Guangdong; Kota Kinabalu, Malaysia; and Mataram, Indonesia. The latitude of the municipality ranges from 39° 27' to 41° 03' N and in longitude from 115° 25' to 117° 30' E.

Beijing's antipode is located in the eastern part of Río Negro Province, Argentina, inland from Viedma.

Maps and satellite images

See also

Neighborhoods in Beijing
Geography of China
North China Plain

References

External links
"Peking", a map from 1914

 
Articles containing video clips